Nebraska is a state in the Midwestern region of the United States. It is bordered by South Dakota to the north; Iowa to the east and Missouri to the southeast, both across the Missouri River; Kansas to the south; Colorado to the southwest; and Wyoming to the west. It is the only triply landlocked U.S. state.

Indigenous peoples, including Omaha, Missouria, Ponca, Pawnee, Otoe, and various branches of the Lakota (Sioux) tribes, lived in the region for thousands of years before European exploration. The state is crossed by many historic trails, including that of the Lewis and Clark Expedition.

Its capital is Lincoln, and its largest city is Omaha, which is on the Missouri River. Nebraska was admitted into the United States in 1867, two years after the end of the American Civil War. The Nebraska Legislature is unlike any other American legislature in that it is unicameral, and its members are elected without any official reference to political party affiliation.

Nebraska is composed of two major land regions: the Dissected Till Plains and the Great Plains. The Dissected Till Plains region consists of gently rolling hills and contains the state's largest cities, Omaha and Lincoln. The Great Plains region, occupying most of western Nebraska, is characterized by treeless prairie. Nebraska has two major climatic zones. The eastern two-thirds of the state has a humid continental climate (Köppen climate classification Dfa); a unique warmer subtype considered "warm-temperate" exists near the southern plains, which is analogous to that in Kansas and Oklahoma, which have a predominantly humid subtropical climate. The Panhandle and adjacent areas bordering Colorado have a primarily semi-arid climate (Köppen BSk). The state has wide variations between winter and summer temperatures, variations that decrease moving south within the state. Violent thunderstorms and tornadoes occur primarily during spring and summer and sometimes in autumn. Chinook wind tends to warm the state significantly in the winter and early spring.

Etymology
Nebraska's name is the result of anglicization of the archaic Otoe words Ñí Brásge, pronounced  (contemporary Otoe Ñíbrahge), or the Omaha Ní Btháska, pronounced , meaning "flat water", after the Platte River which flows through the state.

History

Indigenous peoples lived in the region of present-day Nebraska for thousands of years before European colonization. The historic tribes in the state included the Omaha, Missouria, Ponca, Pawnee, Otoe, and various branches of the Lakota (Sioux), some of which migrated from eastern areas into this region. When European exploration, trade, and settlement began, both Spain and France sought to control the region. In the 1690s, Spain established trade connections with the Apaches, whose territory then included western Nebraska. By 1703, France had developed a regular trade with the native peoples along the Missouri River in Nebraska, and by 1719 had signed treaties with several of these peoples. After war broke out between the two countries, Spain dispatched an armed expedition to Nebraska under Lieutenant General Pedro de Villasur in 1720. The party was attacked and destroyed near present-day Columbus by a large force of Pawnees and Otoes, both allied with the French. The massacre ended Spanish exploration of the area for the remainder of the 18th century.

In 1762, during the Seven Years' War, France ceded the Louisiana territory to Spain. This left Britain and Spain competing for dominance along the Mississippi; by 1773, the British were trading with the native peoples of Nebraska. In response, Spain dispatched two trading expeditions up the Missouri in 1794 and 1795; the second, under James Mackay, established the first European settlement in Nebraska near the mouth of the Platte. Later that year, Mackay's party built a trading post, dubbed Fort Carlos IV (Fort Charles), near present-day Homer.

In 1819, the United States established Fort Atkinson as the first U.S. Army post west of the Missouri River, just east of present-day Fort Calhoun. The army abandoned the fort in 1827 as migration moved further west. European-American settlement was scarce until 1848 and the California Gold Rush. On May 30, 1854, the US Congress created the Kansas and the Nebraska territories, divided by the Parallel 40° North, under the Kansas–Nebraska Act. The Nebraska Territory included parts of the current states of Colorado, North Dakota, South Dakota, Wyoming, and Montana. The territorial capital of Nebraska was Omaha.

In the 1860s, after the U.S. government forced many of the Native American tribes to cede their lands and settle on reservations, it opened large tracts of land to agricultural development by Europeans and Americans. Under the Homestead Act, thousands of settlers migrated into Nebraska to claim free land granted by the federal government. Because so few trees grew on the prairies, many of the first farming settlers built their homes of sod, as had Native Americans such as the Omaha. The first wave of settlement gave the territory a sufficient population to apply for statehood. Nebraska became the 37th state on March 1, 1867, and the capital was moved from Omaha to the center at Lancaster, later renamed Lincoln after the recently assassinated President of the United States, Abraham Lincoln. The battle of Massacre Canyon, on August 5, 1873, was the last major battle between the Pawnee and the Sioux.

During the 1870s to the 1880s, Nebraska experienced a large growth in population. Several factors contributed to attracting new residents. The first was that the vast prairie land was perfect for cattle grazing. This helped settlers to learn the unfamiliar geography of the area. The second factor was the invention of several farming technologies. New agricultural innovations such as barbed wire, windmills, and the steel plow, combined with fair weather, enabled settlers to transform Nebraska into prime farming land. By the 1880s, Nebraska's population had soared to more than 450,000 people. The Arbor Day holiday was founded in Nebraska City by territorial governor J. Sterling Morton. The National Arbor Day Foundation is still headquartered in Nebraska City, with some offices in Lincoln.

In the late 19th century, African Americans migrated from the South to Nebraska as part of the Great Migration. Eventually, they lived primarily to Omaha which offered working-class jobs in meat packing, the railroads and other industries. Omaha has a long history of civil rights activism. Blacks encountered discrimination from other Americans in Omaha and especially from recent European immigrants, ethnic whites who were competing for the same jobs. In 1912, African Americans founded the Omaha chapter of the National Association for the Advancement of Colored People to work for improved conditions in the city and state.

Since the 1960s, Native American activism in the state has increased, both through open protest, activities to build alliances with state and local governments, and in the slower, more extensive work of building tribal institutions and infrastructure. Native Americans in federally recognized tribes have pressed for self-determination, sovereignty and recognition. They have created community schools to preserve their cultures, as well as tribal colleges and universities. Tribal politicians have also collaborated with state and county officials on regional issues.

Geography

The state is bordered by South Dakota to the north; Iowa to the east and Missouri to the southeast, across the Missouri River; Kansas to the south; Colorado to the southwest; and Wyoming to the west. The state has 93 counties and is split between two time zones, with the majority of the state observing Central Time and the Panhandle and surrounding counties observing Mountain Time. Three rivers cross the state from west to east. The Platte River, formed by the confluence of the North Platte and the South Platte, runs through the state's central portion, the Niobrara River flows through the northern part, and the Republican River runs across the southern part.

The first Constitution of Nebraska in 1866 described Nebraska's boundaries as follows (Note that the description of the Northern border is no longer accurate, since the Keya Paha River and the Niobrara River no longer form the boundary of the state of Nebraska. Instead, Nebraska's Northern border now extends east along the forty-third degree of north latitude until it meets the Missouri River directly.): 

Nebraska is composed of two major land regions: the Dissected Till Plains and the Great Plains. The easternmost portion of the state was scoured by Ice Age glaciers; the Dissected Till Plains were left after the glaciers retreated. The Dissected Till Plains is a region of gently rolling hills; Omaha and Lincoln are in this region. The Great Plains occupy most of western Nebraska, with the region consisting of several smaller, diverse land regions, including the Sandhills, the Pine Ridge, the Rainwater Basin, the High Plains and the Wildcat Hills. A past tourism slogan for the state of Nebraska was "Where the West Begins" (it has since been changed to "Honestly, it's not for everyone"). Locations given for the beginning of the "West" in Nebraska include the Missouri River, the intersection of 13th and O Streets in Lincoln (where it is marked by a red brick star), the 100th meridian, and Chimney Rock.

Federal land management

Areas under the management of the National Park Service include:
 Agate Fossil Beds National Monument near Harrison
 California National Historic Trail
 Chimney Rock National Historic Site near Bayard
 Homestead National Monument of America in Beatrice
 Lewis and Clark National Historic Trail
 Missouri National Recreational River near Ponca
 Mormon Pioneer National Historic Trail
 Niobrara National Scenic River near Valentine
 Oregon National Historic Trail
 Pony Express National Historic Trail
 Scotts Bluff National Monument at Gering

Areas under the management of the National Forest Service include:
 Nebraska National Forest
 Oglala National Grassland
 Samuel R. McKelvie National Forest

Climate

Two major climatic zones are represented in Nebraska. The eastern two-thirds of the state has a humid continental climate (Köppen Dfa), although the southwest of this region may be classed as a humid subtropical climate (Cfa) using the  boundary. The Panhandle and adjacent areas bordering Colorado have a semi-arid climate (Köppen BSk). The entire state experiences wide seasonal variations in both temperature and precipitation. Average temperatures are fairly uniform across Nebraska, with hot summers and generally cold winters. However, chinook winds from the Rocky Mountains provide a temporary moderating effect on temperatures in the state's western portion during the winter.

Humidity also decreases significantly from east to west.

Nebraska is located in Tornado Alley. Thunderstorms are common during both the spring and the summer. Violent thunderstorms and tornadoes happen primarily during those two seasons, although they also can occur occasionally during the autumn.

Settlements 

Eighty-nine percent of the cities in Nebraska have fewer than 3,000 people. Nebraska shares this characteristic with five other Midwestern states: Kansas, Oklahoma, North Dakota and South Dakota, and Iowa. Hundreds of towns have a population of fewer than 1,000. Regional population declines have forced many rural schools to consolidate.

Fifty-three of Nebraska's 93 counties reported declining populations between 1990 and 2000, ranging from a 0.06% loss (Frontier County) to a 17.04% loss (Hitchcock County).

More urbanized areas of the state have experienced substantial growth. In 2000, the city of Omaha had a population of 390,007; in 2005, the city's estimated population was 414,521 (427,872 including the recently annexed city of Elkhorn), a 6.3% increase over five years. The 2010 census showed that Omaha has a population of 408,958. The city of Lincoln had a 2000 population of 225,581 and a 2010 population of 258,379, a 14.5% increase.

As of the 2010 census, there were 530 cities and villages in the state of Nebraska. There are five classifications of cities and villages in Nebraska, which are based upon population. All population figures are 2017 Census Bureau estimates unless flagged by a reference number.

Metropolitan Class City (300,000 or more)
 Omaha 466,893

Primary Class City (100,000–299,999)
 Lincoln 284,736

First Class City (5,000–99,999)

 Bellevue 53,424
 Grand Island 51,390
 Kearney 33,835
 Fremont 26,457
 Hastings 24,989
 Norfolk 24,434
 North Platte 23,888
 Columbus 23,128
 Papillion 19,539
 La Vista 17,116
 Scottsbluff 14,874
 South Sioux City 12,911
 Beatrice 12,295
 Lexington 10,024
 Gering 8,319
 Alliance 8,164
 Blair 8,091
 York 7,862
 McCook 7,540
 Ralston 7,333
 Nebraska City 7,313
 Seward 7,181
 Crete 7,160
 Sidney 6,620
 Plattsmouth 6,451
 Schuyler 6,212
 Chadron 5,648
 Wayne 5,439
 Holdrege 5,494
 Gretna 5,062

Second Class Cities (800–4,999) and Villages (100–800) make up the rest of the communities in Nebraska. There are 116 second-class cities and 382 villages in the state.

Metropolitan areas 2017 estimate data
 Omaha-Council Bluffs 763,326 (Nebraska portion); 933,316 (total for Nebraska and Iowa)
 Lincoln 331,519
 Sioux City, Iowa 26,836 (Nebraska portion); 168,618 (total for Nebraska, Iowa and South Dakota)
 Grand Island 85,045

Micropolitan areas 2012 estimate data

Other areas
 Grand Island, Hastings and Kearney comprise the "Tri-Cities" area, with a combined population of 168,748
 The northeast corner of Nebraska is part of the Siouxland region.

Demographics

Population

The United States Census Bureau estimates that the population of Nebraska was 1,934,408 on July 1, 2019, a 5.92% increase since the 2010 United States census. The center of population of Nebraska is in Polk County, in the city of Shelby.

According to HUD's 2022 Annual Homeless Assessment Report, there were an estimated 2,246 homeless people in Nebraska. 

The table below shows the racial composition of Nebraska's population as of 2016.

According to the 2016 American Community Survey, 10.2% of Nebraska's population were of Hispanic or Latino origin (of any race): Mexican (7.8%), Puerto Rican (0.2%), Cuban (0.2%), and other Hispanic or Latino origin (2.0%). The largest ancestry groups were: German (36.1%), Irish (13.1%), English (7.8%), Czech (4.7%), Swedish (4.3%), and Polish (3.5%).

Nebraska has the largest Czech American and non-Mormon Danish American population (as a percentage of the total population) in the nation. Nebraska is also home to the largest Polish American population in the Great Plains. German Americans are the largest ancestry group in most of the state, particularly in the eastern counties. Thurston County (made up entirely of the Omaha and Winnebago reservations) has an American Indian majority, and Butler County is one of only two counties in the nation with a Czech-American plurality.

In recent years, Nebraska has become home to many refugee communities. In 2016, it welcomed more refugees per capita than any other state. Nebraska, and in particular Lincoln, is the largest home of Yazidis refugees and Yazidi Americans in the United States.

Notably, Nebraska was the last of all 50 states to maintain a ban on the issuance of driver's licenses to adults who had entered the United States illegally as children (also known as Dreamers). The state legislature lifted the ban in December 2016.

Birth data

As of 2011, 31.0% of Nebraska's population younger than ageone were minorities.

Note: Births in table don't add up, because Hispanics are counted both by their ethnicity and by their race, giving a higher overall number.

 Since 2016, data for births of White Hispanic origin are not collected, but included in one Hispanic group; persons of Hispanic origin may be of any race.

Religion
The religious affiliations of the people of Nebraska are predominantly Christian, according to a 2014 survey by the Pew Research Center. At the 2020 Public Religion Research Institute survey, 73% of the population identified as Christian. At the 2014 Pew Research Center's survey, 20% of the population were religiously unaffiliated; in 2020, the Public Religion Research Institute determined 22% of the population became religiously unaffiliated.

The largest single denominations by number of adherents in 2010 were the Roman Catholic Church (372,838), the Lutheran Church–Missouri Synod (112,585), the Evangelical Lutheran Church in America (110,110) and the United Methodist Church (109,283).

Taxation

Nebraska has a progressive income tax. The portion of income from $0 to $2,400 is taxed at 2.56%; from $2,400 to $17,500, at 3.57%; from $17,500 to $27,000, at 5.12%; and income over $27,000, at 6.84%. The standard deduction for a single taxpayer is $5,700; the personal exemption is $118.

Nebraska has a state sales and use tax of 5.5%. In addition to the state tax, some Nebraska cities assess a city sales and use tax, in 0.5% increments, up to a maximum of 1.5%. Dakota County levies an additional 0.5% county sales tax. Food and ingredients that are generally for home preparation and consumption are not taxable. All real property within the state of Nebraska is taxable unless specifically exempted by statute. Since 1992, only depreciable personal property is subject to tax and all other personal property is exempt from tax. Inheritance tax is collected at the county level.

Economy

 Total employment (2016): 884,450
 Total employer establishments: 54,265

The Bureau of Economic Analysis estimates of Nebraska's gross state product in 2010 was $89.8 billion. Per capita personal income in 2004 was $31,339, 25th in the nation. Nebraska has a large agriculture sector, and is a major producer of beef, pork, wheat, corn (maize), soybeans, and sorghum. Other important economic sectors include freight transport (by rail and truck), manufacturing, telecommunications, information technology, and insurance.

In October 2021, Nebraska recorded an unemployment rate of 1.9%, the lowest ever recorded for any state.

Industry

Kool-Aid was created in 1927 by Edwin Perkins in the city of Hastings, which celebrates the event the second weekend of every August with Kool-Aid Days, and Kool-Aid is the official soft drink of Nebraska. CliffsNotes were developed by Clifton Hillegass of Rising City. He adapted his pamphlets from the Canadian publications, Coles Notes.

Omaha is home to Berkshire Hathaway, whose chief executive officer (CEO), Warren Buffett, was ranked in March 2009 by Forbes magazine as the second-richest person in the world. The city is also home to Mutual of Omaha, InfoUSA, TD Ameritrade, West Corporation, Valmont Industries, Woodmen of the World, Kiewit Corporation, Union Pacific Railroad, and Gallup. Ameritas Life Insurance Corp., Nelnet, Sandhills Publishing Company, Duncan Aviation, and Hudl are based in Lincoln. The Buckle is based in Kearney. Sidney is the national headquarters for Cabela's, a specialty retailer of outdoor goods now owned by Bass Pro Shops. Grand Island is the headquarters of Hornady, a manufacturer of ammunition.

The world's largest train yard, Union Pacific's Bailey Yard, is in North Platte. The Vise-Grip was invented by William Petersen in 1924, and was manufactured in De Witt until the plant was closed and moved to China in late 2008.

Lincoln's Kawasaki Motors Manufacturing is the only Kawasaki plant in the world to produce the Jet Ski, all-terrain vehicle (ATV), and MULE product lines. The facility employs more than 1,200 people.

The Spade Ranch, in the Sandhills, is one of Nebraska's oldest and largest beef cattle operations.

Energy

Nebraska has been the nation's second-largest producer of ethanol biofuels.  It has few fossil-fuel resources except for crude oil from the Niobrara Formation which underlays a portion of the state's western region.  It hosts one uranium leach mining operation near its northwest border with Wyoming.  It has an abundance of renewable generation resources, including untapped biomass generation potential from its productive agriculture industry. It has been a top-ten state for per-capita energy consumption due in large part to its energy-intensive agriculture, meat packing, and food processing industries.

Nebraska is the only state in the US where all electric utilities are publicly owned.  Half of its electricity is generated from coal and the fastest-growing source in recent years has been wind.  Nebraska has no renewable portfolio standard while supporting net metering.

Transportation

Railroads

The Union Pacific Railroad, headquartered in Omaha, was incorporated on July 1, 1862, in the wake of the Pacific Railway Act of 1862. Bailey Yard, in North Platte, is the largest railroad classification yard in the world. The route of the original transcontinental railroad runs through the state.

Other major railroads with operations in the state are: Amtrak; BNSF Railway; Canadian National Railway; and Iowa Interstate Railroad.

Roads and highways

Public transit
Lincoln StarTran
Omaha Metro Transit
Scottsbluff Tri-City Roadrunner
Sioux City Transit

Intercity bus service
Burlington Trailways
Express Arrow
Jefferson Lines
Panhandle Trails

Law and government

The Government of Nebraska operates under the framework of the Nebraska Constitution, adopted in 1875, and is divided into three branches: executive, legislative, and judicial.

Executive branch
The head of the executive branch is Governor Jim Pillen (Republican). The Governor of Nebraska is the head of government of the U.S. state of Nebraska as provided by the fourth article of the Constitution of Nebraska.  Other elected officials in the executive branch are Lieutenant Governor Mike Foley, Attorney General Mike Hilgers, Secretary of State Bob Evnen, State Treasurer John Murante, and State Auditor Mike Foley. All elected officials in the executive branch serve four-year terms. Nebraska's executive branch has X agencies, including 18 code agencies administered by the Governor.

Legislative branch

Nebraska is the only state in the United States with a 'single-house' unicameral legislature. Although this house is officially known simply as the "Legislature", and more commonly called the "Unicameral", its members call themselves "senators". Nebraska's Legislature is also the only state legislature in the United States that is officially nonpartisan. The senators are elected with no party affiliation next to their names on the ballot, and members of any party can be elected to the positions of speaker and committee chairs. The Nebraska Legislature can also override the governor's veto with a three-fifths majority, in contrast to the two-thirds majority required in some other states.

When Nebraska became a state in 1867, its legislature consisted of two houses: a House of Representatives and a Senate. For years, U.S. Senator George Norris (Senator 1913–1943) and other Nebraskans encouraged the idea of a unicameral legislature and demanded the issue be decided in a referendum. Norris argued:
 Unicameral supporters also argued that a bicameral legislature had a significant undemocratic feature in the committees that reconciled House and Senate legislation. Votes in these committees were secretive, and would sometimes add provisions to bills that neither house had approved. Nebraska's unicameral legislature today has rules that bills can contain only one subject, and must be given at least five days of consideration. In 1934, due in part to the budgetary pressure of the Great Depression, Nebraska citizens ran a state initiative to vote on a constitutional amendment creating a unicameral legislature, which was approved, which, in effect, abolished the House of Representatives (the lower house).

The Legislature meets in the third Nebraska State Capitol building, built between 1922 and 1932. It was designed by Bertram G. Goodhue. Built from Indiana limestone, the capitol's base is a cross within a square. A 400-foot domed tower rises from this base. The Sower, a 19-foot bronze statue representing agriculture, crowns the building.

Judicial branch

The judicial system in Nebraska is unified, with the Nebraska Supreme Court having administrative authority over all the courts within the state. Nebraska uses the Missouri Plan for the selection of judges at all levels, including county courts (as the lowest-level courts) and twelve district courts, which contain one or more counties. The Nebraska State Court of Appeals hears appeals from the district courts, juvenile courts, and workers' compensation courts, and is the final court of appeal.

Federal representation

Nebraska is represented in the U.S. Senate by Republican Deb Fischer, who was first elected in 2012. Nebraska's other Senate seat is currently held by Pete Ricketts, who took office on January 23, 2023.

Nebraska has three representative seats in the U.S. House of Representatives. Until the next election, Nebraska's representatives are Mike Flood (R) of the 1st district, Don Bacon (R) of the 2nd district, and Adrian Smith (R) of the 3rd district.

Nebraska is one of two states (Maine is the other) that allow for a split in the state's allocation of electoral votes in presidential elections. Under a 1991 law, two of Nebraska's five votes are awarded to the winner of the statewide popular vote, while the other three go to the highest vote-getter in each of the state's three congressional districts.

Politics

For most of its history, Nebraska has been a solidly Republican state. Republicans have carried the state in all but one presidential election since 1940: the 1964 landslide election of Lyndon B. Johnson. In the 2004 presidential election, George W. Bush won the state's five electoral votes by a margin of 33 percentage points (making Nebraska's the fourth-strongest Republican vote among states) with 65.9% of the overall vote; only Thurston County, which is majority-Native American, voted for his Democratic challenger John Kerry. In 2008, the state split its electoral votes for the first time: Republican John McCain won the popular vote in Nebraska as a whole and two of its three congressional districts; the second district, which includes the city of Omaha, went for Democrat Barack Obama.

Despite the current Republican domination of Nebraska politics, the state has a long tradition of electing centrist members of both parties to state and federal office; examples include George W. Norris (who served a few years in the Senate as an independent), J. James Exon, Bob Kerrey, and Chuck Hagel. Voters have tilted to the right in recent years, a trend evidenced when Hagel retired from the Senate in 2008 and was succeeded by conservative Republican Mike Johanns to the U.S. Senate, as well as with the 2006 re-election of Ben Nelson, who was considered the most conservative Democrat in the Senate until his retirement in 2013. Johanns retired in 2015 and was succeeded by Ben Sasse, while Nelson retired in 2013 and was succeeded by Deb Fischer, both conservative Republicans.

Though its politics are generally conservative, the state also has a history of progressive reform. Nebraska was the first US state to outlaw sexual assault within a marriage, in 1975. In 1980 it became the first US state to divest from South Africa to protest the racist system of apartheid.

Former President Gerald Ford was born in Nebraska but moved away shortly after birth. Illinois native William Jennings Bryan represented Nebraska in Congress, served as U.S. Secretary of State under President Woodrow Wilson, and unsuccessfully ran for president three times. Former Vice President Dick Cheney was born in Lincoln but moved to  Casper.

Education

Colleges and universities

University of Nebraska system
 University of Nebraska–Lincoln
 University of Nebraska at Kearney
 University of Nebraska at Omaha
 University of Nebraska Medical Center
 Nebraska College of Technical Agriculture
Nebraska State College System
 Chadron State College
 Peru State College
 Wayne State College

Community Colleges
 Central Community College
 Little Priest Tribal College
 Metropolitan Community College
 Mid-Plains Community College
 Nebraska Indian Community College
 Northeast Community College
 Southeast Community College
 Western Nebraska Community College

Private colleges/universities
 Bellevue University
 Clarkson College
 College of Saint Mary
 Concordia University
 Creighton University
 Doane University
 Grace University
 Hastings College
 Midland University
 Nebraska Christian College
 Nebraska Methodist College
 Nebraska Wesleyan University
 Summit Christian College
 Union College
 York College

Culture

Arts

Museums
 International Quilt Study Center & Museum, in Lincoln
 Joslyn Art Museum, in Omaha
 University of Nebraska State Museum, in Lincoln
 Museum of Nebraska Art, in Kearney

Performing arts
 Lied Center for Performing Arts, in Lincoln
 Orpheum Theatre, in Omaha
 Holland Performing Arts Center, in Omaha
 Omaha Community Playhouse, in Omaha
 Rose Blumkin Performing Arts Center, in Omaha
 Blue Barn Theatre, in Omaha
 Omaha Symphony

Sports

Professional sports

Junior-level sports

College sports

Nebraska is currently home to seven member schools of the NCAA, eight of the NAIA, seven of the NJCAA, one of the NCCAA, and one independent school.

The College World Series has been held in Omaha since 1950. It was held at Rosenblatt Stadium from 1950 through 2010, and has been domiciled at Charles Schwab Field Omaha since 2011.

See also

 Index of Nebraska-related articles
 Outline of Nebraska

Notes

References

Bibliography

Surveys

 Andreas, Alfred T., History of the State of Nebraska (1882) (a highly detailed history)
 Archer, J. Clark, et al. Atlas of Nebraska.  (U of Nebraska Press, 2017). Pp. xxii+ 214, color maps, illustrations, photographs, charts, graphs, bibliography. online review 
 Creigh, Dorothy Weyers. Nebraska: A Bicentennial History (1977)
 Faulkner, Virginia, ed. Roundup: A Nebraska Reader (1957)
 Chokecherry Places, Essays from the High Plains, Merrill Gilfillan, Johnson Press, Boulder, Colorado, trade paperback, .
 Hickey, Donald R. Nebraska Moments: Glimpses of Nebraska's Past (1992).
 Miewald, Robert D., Nebraska Government & Politics  (1984)
 Luebke Frederick C. Nebraska: An Illustrated History (1995)
 Naugle, Ronald C., John J. Montag, and James C. Olson. History of Nebraska (4th ed. U of Nebraska Press, 2015). 568 pp. online review 
 Wishart, David J. ed. Encyclopedia of the Great Plains, University of Nebraska Press, 2004, . complete text online ; 900 pages of scholarly articles
 Nebraska: A Guide to the Cornhusker State, WPA Guide, 1939; scanned online edition

Scholarly special studies

 Barnhart, John D. "Rainfall and the Populist Party in Nebraska". American Political Science Review 19 (1925): 527–40. in JSTOR
 Beezley, William H. "Homesteading in Nebraska, 1862–1872", Nebraska History 53 (spring 1972): 59–75
 Bentley, Arthur F. "The Condition of the Western Farmer as Illustrated by the Economic History of a Nebraska Township". Johns Hopkins University Studies in Historical and Political Science 11 (1893): 285–370
 Cherny, Robert W. Populism, Progressivism, and the Transformation of Nebraska Politics, 1885–1915 (1981) 
 Bogue Allen G. Money at Interest: The Farm Mortgage on the Middle Border (1955)
 Brunner, Edmund de S. Immigrant Farmers and Their Children (1929)
 Chudacoff, Howard P. Mobile Americans: Residential and Social Mobility in Omaha, 1880–1920 (1972)
 Chudacoff, Howard P. "A New Look at Ethnic Neighborhoods: Residential Dispersion and the Concept of Visibility in a Medium-sized City". Journal of American History 60 (1973): 76–93. about Omaha; in JSTOR
 Coletta, Paolo E. William Jennings Bryan.  3 vols. (1964–69)
 Dick, Everett. The Sod-House Frontier: 1854–1890 (1937)
 Farragher, John Mack. Women and Men on the Overland Trail (1979)
 Fuller, Wayne E. The Old Country School: The Story of Rural Education in the Midwest (1982)
 Grant, Michael Johnston. "Down and Out on the Family Farm" (2002)
 Harper, Ivy. Walzing Matilda: Life and Times of Nebraska Senator Robert Kerrey (1992)
 Holter, Don W. Flames on the Plains: A History of United Methodism in Nebraska (1983)
 Jeffrey, Julie Roy. Frontier Women: The Trans-Mississippi West, 1840–1880 (1979)
 Klein, Maury. Union Pacific: The Birth of a Railroad, 1862–1893 (1986)
 
 Larsen, Lawrence H. The Gate City: A History of Omaha (1982)
 Lowitt, Richard. George W. Norris 3 vols. (1971)
 Luebke, Frederick C. Immigrants and Politics: The Germans of Nebraska, 1880–1900 (1969)
 Luebke, Frederick C. "The German-American Alliance in Nebraska, 1910–1917". Nebraska History 49 (1969): 165–85
 Olson, James C. J. Sterling Morton (1942)
 Overton, Richard C. Burlington West: A Colonization History of the Burlington Railroad (1941)
 Parsons Stanley B. "Who Were the Nebraska Populists?" Nebraska History 44 (1963): 83–99
 Pierce, Neal. The Great Plains States (1973)
 Pederson, James F., and Kenneth D. Wald. Shall the People Rule? A History of the Democratic Party in Nebraska Politics (1972)
 Riley, Glenda. The Female Frontier. A Comparative View of Women on the Prairie and the Plains (1978)
 Wenger, Robert W. "The Anti-Saloon League in Nebraska Politics, 1898–1910". Nebraska History 52 (1971): 267–92

External links

 Nebraska state government
 Nebraska Division of Travel and Tourism
 Energy Profile for Nebraska
 USGS real-time, geographic, and other scientific resources of Nebraska 
 Nebraska State Facts from USDA
 Nebraska Frequently Asked Questions
 Nebraska State Publications Online 
 Nebraska city-data
 
 nebraskastudies.org History of Nebraska from Nebraska Department of Education, Nebraska State Historical Society, and NET
 Nebraska State Databases Annotated list of searchable databases produced by Nebraska state agencies and compiled by the Government Documents Roundtable of the American Library Association.
 

 
States and territories established in 1867
States of the United States
Midwestern United States
Articles containing video clips
1867 establishments in the United States
Contiguous United States